Bolachikkalaki village in the southern state of Karnataka, India. Administratively it is under Vijayapur Taluka of Vijayapur district, Karnataka. It is located nearly 45 kilometres (25 mi) from district headquarter Vijayapur.

Demographics
In the 2011 census, the village had a population of 3,095.

Geography
Village is situated geographically at 16* 32' 10 north latitude and 75* 31' 19 east longitude.

Temples
Shri Hanuman Temple
Shri Durga Devi Temple
Shri Pandurang Temple
Shri Mallikarjun Temple

Religion
Village is having mainly Hindu and Muslim community people.

Language
People speak mainly in Kannada also Hindi, Marathi, Urdu and English as well.

Mosques
Mosque and Maszid for Muslim community. Moharam and Uras festivals are celebrated by both Hindu and Muslim religion.

Agriculture
The village land is quite fertile, with over 70% of it being well-suited to cultivation and crop production. Farmers there grow mainly sugar cane, grapes, maize, and sorghum. Small areas are planted in citrus orchards, and crops such as onions and turmeric. Irrigation is mainly based upon distribution canals from the river, borewells and open wells.

Education
In village a Govt Higher Primary School has currently working with 1st to 7th standard having more than 150 students.

Charities/trusts
There are various associations doing cultural, sports, programmes and other activities.

Festivals
The main celebrated each year are Kara Hunnume, Nagara Panchami, Deepavli, Ugadi, and Dassara.

Literacy rate
The village literacy rate is about 75%. Males has 75% and Female has 65% of literacy.

Politics
Village is comes under Babaleshwar Assembly Constituency and Vijayapur Parliamentary Constituency.

Telephone code
 Babaleshwar - 08355

PIN code
 Sarawad - 586125
Head office is in Sarawad.

State Highway
State Highway - 55 => Babaleshwar - Kambagi - Galagali- Mudhol

References

External links
 

Villages in Bijapur district, Karnataka